The following is a list of episodes for the children's television series Transformers: Rescue Bots. The series is based on Hasbro's Transformers franchise and mainly one of Transformerss subdivisions Transformers: Rescue Bots.

Series overview

Episodes

Season 1 (2011–12)

Season 2 (2014)

Season 3 (2014–15) 
A third season has been announced. In addition, Michael Bell is returning to the Transformers franchise for the third season as High Tide. A third season was also the first Hasbro Studios and DHX Media co-production not to have a TV-Y rating (which DHX Media also later acquired library of children's and Family TV content for Beast Wars: Transformers in November 2014.)

Season 4 (2016) 
On March 31, 2015, Discovery Family announced via press release that the series was renewed for a fourth season.

References 

Rescue Bots
Lists of American children's animated television series episodes